Consensus model may refer to:
Consensus decision-making
Consensus model (criminal justice)
Consensus Model for APRN Regulation